Robert Lieberman (born July 16, 1947) is an American motion picture and television director.

Personal life
Lieberman was married from June 27, 1990 to June 7, 2001 to actress Marilu Henner; the divorced couple has two children, Nicholas Morgan and Joseph Marlon. He also has two children, Erin and Lorne Lieberman, from his first marriage. Lieberman married former model Victoria Peters in 2010.

Career 
Lieberman was the founder of the commercial production company Harmony Pictures and has, himself, directed close to two thousand commercials. He has received many Clio nominations and has won 29. Lieberman in 1980 was the first winner of the DGA Award for Best Commercial Director. He was nominated another three times for the DGA Award and in 1996 won his second award. He also directed one film with Akshay Kumar called Speedy Singhs starring Camilla Belle and  Vinay Virmani.

Filmography

Director
 Fighting Back (1980)
 Will: G. Gordon Liddy (1982)
 Table for Five (1983)
 To Save a Child (1991)
 All I Want for Christmas (1991)
 Fire in the Sky (1993)
 D3: The Mighty Ducks (1996)
 Titanic (1996)
 NetForce (1999)
 Red Skies (2002)
 Second String (2002)
 The Dead Zone (2002)
 Final Days of Planet Earth (2006)
 The Stranger (2010)
 The Tortured (2010)
 Breakaway (2011)

Television:
 ABC Afterschool Specials (1978)
 thirtysomething (1987)
 Dream Street (1989)
 The Young Riders (1989)
 Gabriel's Fire (1990)
 The X-Files (1993)
 Harts of the West (1993)
 Under Suspicion (1994)
 Medicine Ball (1995)
 Maloney (1996)
 Once and Again (1999)
 The X-Files (1999)
 Strong Medicine (2000)
 The Dead Zone (2002)
 Jake 2.0 (2003)
 Earthsea (2004)
 Killer Instinct (2005)
 A.M.P.E.D. (2007)
 Dexter (2006)
 Shark (2006)
 Brothers & Sisters (2007)
 Eureka (2007)
 Republic of Doyle (2009)
 Lost Girl (2010–2011)
 Haven (2010–2014)
 Nikita (2011)
 Eve of Destruction (2013)
 The Expanse (TV series) (2016)
 Private Eyes (TV series) (2016)
 Rogue (2016–2017)

Producer
 To Save a Child (1991)
 Abandoned and Deceived (1995)
 Rag and Bone (1997)
 A.M.P.E.D. (2007)

Television:
 Dream Street (1989)
 Gabriel's Fire (1990)
 Harts of the West (1993)
 Marilu (1994)
 Under Suspicion (1994)
 Medicine Ball (1995)
 Moloney (1996)
 Strong Medicine (2000)
 The Dead Zone (2002)
 Jake 2.0 (2003)
 The Casino (2004)

Writer
 The Casino (2004)
 Killer Instinct (2005)

Notes

External links 
 

1947 births
Living people
American film directors
Artists from Buffalo, New York
American television directors
20th-century American Jews
University at Buffalo alumni
Advertising directors
21st-century American Jews